Pan was the eighth  and final studio album released by the Japanese band The Blue Hearts. It was the only album not to have any songs that were released as singles.

Track listing
"Drummers' Session" (ドラマーズ・セッション)
"Houston Blues" (ヒューストン・ブルース)
"Modotte Okure Yo" (もどっておくれよ Come Back to Me)
"Boin Killer" (ボインキラー Breast Killer)
"Hana ni Natta Kamakiri" (花になったかまきり Praying Mantis that Became a Flower)
"Bye-bye Baby" (バイバイBaby)
"Aruku Hana" (歩く花 Walking Flower)
"Kyūjitsu" (休日 Holiday)
"Tobago no Yume" (トバゴの夢 Dream of Tobago)
"Kōfuku no Seisansha" (幸福の生産者 Producer of Happiness)
"Good Friend (Ai no Mikata)" (Good Friend（愛の味方） Good Friend (Friend of Love))
"Hitotoki no Yume" (ひとときの夢 Temporary Dream)
"Arigato-san" (ありがとさん Thanks a lot)

References

The Blue Hearts albums
1995 albums